Kisatchie Hills Wilderness is a  designated wilderness area in the U.S. state of Louisiana.  Contained within Kisatchie National Forest, the wilderness is managed by the U.S. Forest Service. 
In addition to a variety of wildlife, the area features terrain that is unusually rugged for Louisiana. Undeveloped except for its trail system, the area may be accessed only by foot or on horseback.

The wilderness is traversed by a  trail, known as the Backbone Trail, which is popular with day hikers and overnight backpackers. There are also two shorter spur trails that branch off the Backbone Trail.

A sand-bottomed stream called Bayou Cypre (pronounced "seep") is fed by the many tributary streams that drain the wilderness area. Bayou Cypre flows out across the eastern boundary, and hikers must wade across it in order to traverse the complete Backbone Trail.

See also
 List of wilderness areas of the United States
 Wilderness Act

References

External links
 Backbone Trail description at LouisianaHikes.com
 Article on the Backbone Trail from The Town Talk

1980 establishments in Louisiana
Protected areas established in 1980
Protected areas of Louisiana
Wilderness areas of the United States